Pierce the Veil is an American rock band from San Diego, California, formed in 2006. They have released five studio albums, ten singles, and ten music videos.

Studio albums

Video albums

Singles

Other charted songs

Music videos

Original multi-artist compilation appearances

See also
List of songs recorded by Pierce the Veil

References

Discographies of American artists
Discography
Post-hardcore group discographies